The Face of Mercy is a 2016 documentary about St. Faustina, her mystical visions, and the role that Divine Mercy has played in different people's lives. It is narrated by Jim Caviezel.

Synopsis
In 2015, Pope Francis declared an Extraordinary Jubilee of Mercy. The "year of mercy" began on December 8, 2015, the Feast of the Immaculate Conception, and ended on November 20, 2016.  The documentary "draws connections between the history of Divine Mercy and this year's Extraordinary Jubilee Year of Mercy" and weaves together a thoughtful, beautiful, and educational film. Thus it is fitting that it is Pope Francis who says the first lines on screen. This is the context for this documentary, which came out during the last month of the Extraordinary Jubilee.

One of the first things said in the documentary, during the opening montage, is that "mercy is loves second name," which is a paraphrased quote of John Paul II. Divine Mercy, they argue, is God's response to the horrors of the 20th Century.

History
It begins with the history of St. Faustina and how John Paul II (Karol Wojtyła) brought the message given to St. Faustina by God. It also highlights the influence Divine Mercy played in the life in the young Wojtyła. George Weigel explains that this devotion culminated years later in his second Encyclical entitled Dives in Misericordia (or Rich in Mercy).

In addition to Weigel are John Allen, a Vatican Journalist, and Andrzej Duda, the President of Poland. They both tell of their perspectives on Divine Mercy.

Theology
Lead by Scott Hahn, Cardinal Marc Ouellet, Fr. Michael Gaitley, Cardinal Seán O'Malley, and Fr. Seraphim Michalenko, the film uncovers the depth of the message St. Faustina received from Jesus. Furthermore, Weigel articulates the message of John Paul II's Dives in Misericordia saying, "In Christ we meet the Merciful face of the Father and the Truth about our Humanity."

Film Festivals Awards

References

External links

 The Face of Mercy on Formed.org

2016 films
2016 documentary films
Documentary films about religion
American documentary films
2010s English-language films
2010s American films